Gracupica is a genus of Asian birds in the family Sturnidae. It is sometimes merged with Sturnus or Sturnia.

Taxonomy
The genus Gracupica was introduced in 1831 by the French naturalist René Lesson to accommodate the black-collared starling which is therefore the type species. The genus name combines the Latin graculus  meaning "jackdaw" with pica meaning "magpie".

Species
The genus contains four species.

A 2021 study found that G. contra represents a species complex of 3 distinct species formerly thought to be subspecies of G. contra: the Indian pied myna (G. contra sensu stricto) from most of the Indian Subcontinent, Myanmar, and Yunnan in China; the Siamese pied myna (G. floweri) from Thailand and Cambodia, and the possibly extinct in the wild Javan pied myna (G. jalla), historically known from Java and Bali in Indonesia. The International Ornithological Congress has accepted these results.

References

External links

 
 

 
Bird genera
Sturnidae
 
Taxa named by René Lesson